Enfield is an urban community located  north of Halifax Stanfield International Airport in the Shubenacadie Valley on the border of Hants and Halifax counties in Nova Scotia, Canada.  Specifically, Enfield exists in both the  East Hants Municipal District and Halifax and is divided by the Shubenacadie River.

History
Grants of land around what is now Enfield were given after 1760. The first was given to a Benjamin Franklin, a parcel of land on the side of the Shubenacadie River opposite the main part of the present village. A Mr. Hall was hired by Franklin to take charge of the grant, and to operate a Wayside Inn. 
The Grand Lake East area was the location of another grant that was later purchased by  Norman Fitzgerald Uniacke on speculation that the newly built Shubenacadie canal would provide him and his brother with a strategic location from which  they could transport goods.

Andrew Horne, son of Jacob Horne, purchased land in the area that is today known as the Horne Settlement  Enfield became a village comparatively late in the history of Nova Scotia; it does not appear in any early census of the province. Early people living in the area were probably listed under Nine Mile River, Douglas or 'The Crossing'. (Enfield was previously known as 'The Crossing'.) It is recorded that Enfield was named at a public meeting, called at Malcolm's Pottery in 1862. Thomas B. Donaldson suggested the name Enfield. In 1863, due to his interest and perseverance, the name "Enfield" was officially adopted as the name for the settlement.  It has been said that he took a fancy to the name when he resided in the town of Enfield, Connecticut.  On selling out his general store business in 1867, he purchased the Hall farm located in the OX-Bow on the Hants side of the Shubenacadie River, crossed by the bridge on Highway No. 2.  This farm was operated by his son Charles F. for the years 1900 – 1950, and the old homestead is now part of the large modern home owned by his grandson, Frank C. Donaldson. Firmly established as a permanent resident in 1871, Thomas B. drew a plan for a church building in the village.  His plan was adopted and the building erected within the year.  Eleven men went to the woods to get out logs – some of these were T. Kenty, C. Todd, Lang, Miller, and the Halls.  The 105th anniversary of this church was celebrated on June 20, 1976, when every pew was filled.  It was by then a part of the United Church of Canada, but originally, the church was Methodist. When the congregation joined the United Church in Elmsdale, the building was turned over to the Women's Institute of Nova Scotia-Enfield Branch. It became the home of the Enfield Heritage Centre, which was founded by the WINS (Enfield Branch.)  The church building was demolished in the early 2000s, after the Women's Institute members could no longer maintain it. The Enfield Heritage Centre is now housed in the former E H Horne School and is maintained by the Enfield Heritage Centre Association.

It is said that the first school was built at Horne Settlement, and serviced young and old alike. Among the school teachers was Miss Sarah Hanson who came out of the state of Maine, with others who were interested in investing in the Shubenacadie Canal. Later a school was built at Enfield near where the current Chinese restaurant is situated. This building was used as school until the early 1940s.  It was later divided into two parts and became the homes of Marie & Vince Horne and Margaret & Andy MacDonnell. There was a school on the Horne Settlement Road near Jack Hawkins house (on the opposite side of the road) for many years. It remained abandoned for some years, and has since been demolished. In 1942 a new school was built and gifted to the community by Edmund H Horne. This school opened in January 1943 and served the people of Enfield as a school until June 2000. The Enfield District School was later built as the population of Enfield grew, and along with the E H Horne School it housed the elementary grade students of Enfield. In June 2000 the new Enfield District school opened to replace both the E H Horne School and the former Enfield District School. The new school serves grades Primary to Five. The other grades now go to school in Milford at either the Riverside Education Centre or for the higher grades to Hants East Rural High.
 
The area is primarily a bedroom community for those working in HRM or at the  Halifax Stanfield International Airport.

Situated near the halfway point between Halifax and Truro, Enfield was once home to a prominent railway station constructed by the Nova Scotia Railway and later the Intercolonial Railway and Canadian National Railway; it has since been sold, moved and now is a private cottage near Monte Vista.  During the mid-19th century, a system of locks on the Shubenacadie River in Enfield assisted small vessels in navigating from the Bay of Fundy to nearby Shubenacadie Grand Lake as part of the Shubenacadie Canal.

The Enfield Rugby Football Club (Established 2007) won the NSRFU Summer Division II Championship against the Halifax Tars  26-12 after completing an undefeated 8-0 season. They were also the Truro 7's Indoor Rugby Men's Div 'A' Champions for 2009.

On April 19, 2020, a spree killing that spanned a wide area of Nova Scotia resulted in a police chase that ended on Highway 2 in Enfield.

Climate
Enfield has a humid continental climate with some marine influence, as typical of Nova Scotia.

Demographics 

Economy

Air Canada Jazz, CanJet, and Maritime Air Charter are headquartered in Enfield and in the Halifax Regional Municipality.

Regional airline Air Nova, which became a part of Air Canada Jazz, is headquartered in Enfield.

Notable residents
Hip-hop artist Classified 
Professional wrestler Lincoln Steen
Famous Canadian prospector E.H. Horne
Stanley Cup champion Sidney Crosby has a home on Grand Lake in Enfield.
Member of Parliament for Kings-Hants, Kody Blois

Eating establishments 
 Shooters Bar and Grill
 Irving Big Stop
 Tim Hortons
 Golden Harvest (Chinese Restaurant)
 Burger King

References

Communities in Hants County, Nova Scotia
Communities in Halifax, Nova Scotia
Designated places in Nova Scotia
General Service Areas in Nova Scotia